ABC's Wide World of Sports was intended to be a fill-in show for a single summer season, until the start of fall sports seasons, but became unexpectedly popular. The goal of the program was to showcase sports from around the globe that were seldom, if ever, broadcast on American television. It originally ran for two hours on Saturday afternoons, but was later reduced to 90 minutes.

Usually, "Wide World" featured two or three events per show. These included many types not previously seen on American television, such as hurling, rodeo, curling, jai-alai, firefighter's competitions, wrist wrestling, powerlifting, surfing, logger sports, demolition derby, slow pitch softball, barrel jumping, and badminton. NASCAR Grand National/Winston Cup racing was a Wide World of Sports staple until the late 1980s, when it became a regularly scheduled sporting event on the network. Traditional Olympic sports such as figure skating, skiing, gymnastics and track and field competitions were also regular features of the show. Another memorable regular feature in the 1960s and 1970s was Mexican cliff diving. The lone national television broadcast of the Continental Football League was a Wide World of Sports broadcast of the 1966 championship game; ABC paid the league $500 for a rights fee, a minuscule sum by professional football standards.

Wide World of Sports was the first U.S. television program to air coverage of – among events – Wimbledon (1961), the Indianapolis 500 (highlights starting in 1961; a longer-form version in 1965), the NCAA Men's Basketball Championship (1962), the Daytona 500 (1962), the U.S. Figure Skating Championships (1962), the Monaco Grand Prix (1962), the Little League World Series (1961), The British Open Golf Tournament (1961), the X-Games (1994) and the Grey Cup (1962).

1960s

1961

1962

1963

1964

1965

1966

1967

1968
{| class="wikitable"
|-
|Day
|Event
|-
|January 27
|Wide World of Sports first journey to the village of Kitzbühel for alpine ski racing.
|-
|March 2 & 9
|World Figure Skating Championships from Geneva.
|-
|March 9
|International Cliff Diving Championships from Acapulco.
|-
|March 30
|Jean-Claude Killy is featured in races from Rossland, British Columbia. 
|-
|June 8
|Pre-empted by Senator Robert Kennedy's Funeral.
|-
|June 15
|Indianapolis 500.
|-
|June 29
|Old Man of Hoy Rock Climb in Scotland.
|-
|September 7
|U.S. Men's Olympic Swimming Trials. 
|-
|September 14 & 21
|U.S. Olympic Men's Track & Field Trials from Echo Summit, California.
|- 
|November 9
|Grand Prix of Mexico.
|}

1969

1970s

1970

1971

1972

1973

1974

1975

1976

1977

1978

1979

1980s

1980

1981

1982

1983

1984

1985

1986

1987

1988

1989

1990s

1990

1991
{| class="wikitable"
|-
|Day|Event|-
|January 19
|Men's World Cup Downhill from Wengen is canceled after Gernot Reinstadler of Austria falls during a qualifying run and later dies from internal injuries. Meanwhile, the U.S. Ski Team withdraws from the World Cup circuit due to the Gulf War.
|-
|January 26
|World champion Svetlana Boginskaya is upset by teammate Tatiana Lisenko in the all-around at the World Cup Gymnastics Championships. Meanwhile, the World Challenge of Champions feature 1984 Olympic Games gold medalists Torvill and Dean,
|-
|February 2
|The Harlem Globetrotters from Disney MGM Studios in Orlando. Hosted by Jim Valvano, with a special guest appearance by Miss Piggy. Plus, a replay of Whitney Houston singing the National Anthem at Super Bowl XXV. And an interview with quarterback Todd Marinovich after he is suspended from USC football team due to drugs and declares himself eligible for the NFL Draft.
|-
|February 16
|U.S. Figure Skating Championships in Minneapolis. Plus, a feature on Nancy Kerrigan and her legally blind mother Brenda.
|-
|March 2
|Riddick Bowe versus Tyrell Biggs.
|-
|March 16
|Rick Swenson wins his record fifth Iditarod Trail Sled Dog Race.
|-
|April 13
|Tonya Harding performs a triple Axel in her exhibition performance at the U.S. Figure Skating Championships. Plus, Mark Spitz begins his very public comeback to competitive swimming with a spot on the 1992 Olympic team as his goal.
|-
|April 27
|Mark Spitz meets Matt Biondi in another 50-meter butterfly match race. Biondi wins, but Spitz finishes closer to Biondi than he did to Tom Jager the week before.
|-
|April 29
|''Wide World of Sports 30th anniversary show with hosts Jim McKay and  Frank Gifford.
|-
|May 4
|Kentucky Derby.
|-
|June 1
|Mike Tyson scores a TKO of Razor Ruddock in a heavyweight fight, taped on March 18.
|-
|June 8
|Belmont Stakes.
|-
|July 13
|As the International Olympic Committee lifts its ban prohibiting South Africa from competing in the Olympics, WWOS features U.S. javelin thrower Tom Petranoff, who was banned by U.S. track officials from worldwide competition for having competed in South Africa in violation of the international sports boycott. Petranoff talks about his relocation to South Africa and his desire to compete for his new country in the Olympics.
|-
|August 10
|ABC strikes a deal with the U.S. Treasury Department and obtains the exclusive rights to televise the Cuban hosted Pan American Games. The telecast features over 20 hours of comprehensive coverage and a rare look inside Cuba. The highlight of the trip is an ABC WWOS exclusive interview, conducted by Jim McKay with Fidel Castro.
|}

1992

1993

1994

1995

1996

1997

1998

Notes
On January 3, 1998, long time Wide World of Sports host Jim McKay declared that Wide World of Sports'' was canceled; the hour and a half of all sorts of sports was replaced by a studio host introducing single event broadcasts such as the Indianapolis 500, horse racing's Triple Crown, and the national and World Championships in figure skating.

1999

2000s

2000
January 30 – Before Super Bowl XXXIV, Wide World aired The Road to the Super Bowl which chronicles the 1999 NFL Season produced in association with NFL Films.
July 23 – Tiger Woods became the youngest golfer to complete a career grand slam by winning the 2000 Open Championship.
August 5 – In what turned out to be the last NASCAR race broadcast on Wide World of Sports, Bobby Labonte won the Brickyard 400 at an average speed of over 155 miles per hour with only 2 caution flags.

2001
June 9 – The Colorado Avalanche captured their second Stanley Cup championship over the New Jersey Devils in 7 games and Ray Bourque finally got his championship in what turned out to be his last game.
September 16 – preempted due to 9/11

2002
May 26 – In one of the most controversial finishes in the history of the Indianapolis 500, Helio Castroneves won his 2nd Indianapolis 500. Paul Tracy passed Castroneves on the last lap while a crash occurred at another part of the track, but it was ruled that Tracy did not completely overtake Castroneves before the yellow flag was raised, making Castroneves the winner of the race.

2003
January 26 – Before Super Bowl XXXVII, Wide World aired the Road to the Super Bowl which chronicles the 2002 NFL Season produced in association with NFL Films.

2006
July 23 – Playing in his first Major Golf Championship since his father Earl Woods, Tiger Woods fought off three of the world's best golfers including Chris DiMarco to win the 2006 Open Championship by 2 strokes at the Royal Liverpool Golf Club.

References

Sources
Highlights
Wide World of Sports Highlights -- 1960s
Wide World of Sports Highlights -- 1970s
Wide World of Sports Highlights -- 1980s
Wide World of Sports Highlights -- 1990s
Classic Wide World of Sports on TV.com
Episode list for ABC's Wide World of Sports (1961) 
Wide World of Sports broadcasts

Wide World of Sports (American TV series)
Wide World of Sports (American TV series)
Events broadcast on Wide World of Sports (American TV series)